Synclysmus is a genus of moths in the family Geometridae erected by Arthur Gardiner Butler in 1879.

Species
Synclysmus grisescens Viette, 1971
Synclysmus niger Viette, 1971
Synclysmus nigrocristatus Prout, 1918
Synclysmus niveus Butler, 1879
Synclysmus opulentus Herbulot, 1965

References

Geometrinae